A Letter to Freddy Buache is a 1982 French short documentary film directed by Jean-Luc Godard and addressed to the Swiss film critic Freddy Buache. It was screened in the Un Certain Regard section at the 1982 Cannes Film Festival.

See also
 Jean-Luc Godard filmography

References

External links

1982 films
1982 short films
1980s short documentary films
1980s French-language films
French short documentary films
Films directed by Jean-Luc Godard
1980s French films